The 2019 season was Hammarby Fotboll's 104st in existence, their 50th season in Allsvenskan and their 5th consecutive season in the league. They competed in Allsvenskan and Svenska Cupen during the year. League play started in early April and lasted until November. Stefan Billborn made his second season as manager.

Summary
Hammarby started the league play in a mediocre fashion, but made a strong finish to the season (with eight straight wins during between match day 22 and 30) and ultimately finished 3rd in Allsvenskan. This meant that the club qualified for the 2020–21 UEFA Europa League, their first continental competition in over ten years.

Players

Squad information

Transfers

In

Out

Player statistics

Appearances and goals

Disciplinary record

Club

Coaching staff

Other information

Pre-season and friendlies

Friendlies

Competitions

Allsvenskan

League table

Results summary

Results by round

Matches
Kickoff times are in (UTC+01) unless stated otherwise.

April

May

June

July

August

September

October

November

Svenska Cupen

2018–19
The tournament continued from the 2018 season.

Kickoff times are in UTC+1.

Group 4

Knockout stage

2019–20
The tournament continues into the 2020 season.

Qualification stage

Footnotes

References

Hammarby Fotboll seasons
Hammarby Fotboll